Geletrol is the trade name for a form of aluminium oleate, a chemical substance of chemical formula (C18H33O2)2AlOH and empirical formula (C18H33O2)1,7Al(OH)1,3. It is an amorphous solid derived from aluminum hydroxide and oleic acid, non-uniformly composed.

It was employed during World War II as a fuel thickener for incendiary purposes by the Australian army.

History 
Research into a gasoline thickener was started in 1943 in Maribyrnong, Victoria, at the suggestion of the Chemical Defense Board. Various substances, mainly metallic soaps, were tried. There was no conclusion to the investigation, and it was then abandoned for a time.

The investigation was resumed when the U.S. Army discovered that the employment of thickened fuel was highly effective in neutralizing Japanese bunkers.

In early 1944, representatives of the Australian Army requested from the Lubricants and Bearings Section through the Scientific Liaison Bureau that some considered methods of gelling gasoline for flamethrower fuels.

The American and British armies had different methods of preparing fuels for flamethrowers. The British army developed a specific form of aluminum stearate that required a specialized process to manufacture its incendiary fuel. The British process prepared two types of incendiary fuels:

 Fuel for portable flamethrowers: Lower viscosity fuel contained in 8-gallon imperial drums.
 Fuel for mechanized flamethrowers: Higher viscosity fuel contained in 45-gallon imperial drums.

The "British method" was considered unsuitable for Australian purposes. The Australian method required fuel to be prepared in the field by treating ordinary gasoline. The gelling agent, called napalm, employed by the US Army met these requirements, but was not available in quantity to the Army, and the materials used in the preparation of napalm were not procurable. The problem, therefore, was to develop a suitable and simple method with local materials.

Information obtained from the Vacuum Oil Company has shown that metal oleates can be suitable thickeners. As a preliminary investigation, about 20 soaps of oleic acid of different basicities were tested. The preliminary result showed that the only suitable oleate was mono- and dihydroxylated aluminum oleate. Research continued on the development of this form of aluminum oleate, in order to find the best degree of substitution of functional groups.
The thickener was adopted in October 1944. The first use of the thickener was in portable flamethrowers (M1 and M2). Later, the Department of Munitions produced a mechanised flame-thrower capable of being mounted on tanks. The flamethrower was adapted for the matilda tank. Flame-throwers were used by Australian troops in New Guinea, Bougainville and Borneo in 1945. The employment of the thickener was requested in tons per week.

References 

Incendiary weapons
Flamethrowers
Australian inventions
Soaps